Sargul-e Namak (also Romanized as Sargūl-e Namaḵ) is a village in Beyranvand-e Jonubi Rural District, Bayravand District, Khorramabad County, Lorestan Province, Iran. At the 2006 census, its population was 187, in 43 families.

References 

Towns and villages in Khorramabad County